Gina Gail Gillespie (born September 20, 1951) is an American former child actress best known for her recurring roles in the television series Law of the Plainsman and Karen, and for playing Pippi Longstocking in a 1961 episode of Shirley Temple's Storybook. She later attended law school and became an attorney.

Early life
Gillespie was born in San Gabriel, California, the daughter of Herbert Gillespie and Rean Tibeau Gillespie, who had been vaudeville dancers. In 1955, when her sister Darlene became a Mouseketeer, the family moved to Burbank, California. She has three other siblings.

Acting career
Discovered by Alfred Hitchcock, Gillespie began acting on television when she was four years old. In 1958, she obtained small roles in Andy Hardy Comes Home and The Lost Missile.

In 1959 she was cast in the recurring role of Tess Logan, an eight-year-old orphan, in the western television series  Law of the Plainsman, which ran on NBC from October 1, 1959, to September 22, 1960. Reruns of the series were broadcast on ABC from July through September 1962.

She continued to act in both television series and films, including playing dual roles in Pippi Longstocking, a 1961 episode of Shirley Temple's Storybook. The story differs from the famous children's novel, for it is about a girl named Susan Ann Scholfield who tells her younger sister that, if she had her own way, she would be a girl named Pippi and live in a house with a monkey, a horse and a box of gold. The episode then shows the adventures Susan imagines.

In 1962 Gillespie played the role of young Blanche in the critically acclaimed film What Ever Happened to Baby Jane?, and received good reviews for her performance.

In 1964 she was cast as Mimi Scott, the tomboyish younger sister in the television series Karen, which was broadcast on NBC from October 5, 1964, to August 30, 1965.

Filmography

Later life
Gillespie graduated from Providence High School in Burbank, and married James MacDonald on May 5, 1973. She later attended the University of La Verne College of Law and graduated Cum Laude in 1988. After being admitted to the California State Bar she became a practicing attorney.

References

1951 births
American child actresses
American television actresses
20th-century American actresses
American film actresses
University of La Verne alumni
20th-century American women lawyers
20th-century American lawyers
Living people
21st-century American women